Ardeth Mary Margaret Wood (October 28, 1975 – August 6, 2003) was a Canadian graduate student who was killed in a forcible drowning in Ottawa. The initial search for Wood was one of the largest search efforts in the city's history, and the two-year search for her killer was one of the largest manhunts in Canada.

Biography
Ardeth Wood was the first daughter born to Brenden Wood and Catherine Ashley on October 28, 1975 in Saint John, New Brunswick. Wood spent most of her life in Ottawa, where she graduated from Lester B. Pearson Catholic High School in 1994 and studied philosophy and history at Carleton University. After earning a B.A. in 1999 and an M.A. in 2001, she began pursuing a PhD in philosophy at the University of Waterloo. There, Wood was recognized as an exceptional student and was co-editor of Eidos: The Canadian Graduate Journal of Philosophy.

Murder
In the summer of 2003, Wood was on leave from her doctoral studies and was visiting her family in Ottawa. She was last seen on August 6 riding her bicycle on a path along the Rockcliffe Parkway in the city's east end. News of her disappearance was reported widely in Canada, and the entire city of Ottawa rallied around a search effort that involved the police, the military and hundreds of volunteers. Her body was found in the woods around Green's Creek on August 11. Her clothes were never found and no foreign DNA was found on her body. Ottawa police received many tips that a man on a bicycle was seen luring women into the woods along the path where Wood was last seen. A composite sketch of the murder suspect was compiled soon thereafter, and was widely distributed across Canada.

On October 20, 2005, police arrested 25-year-old Chris Myers near Renfrew. Myers had been previously charged with assaults in Ottawa and North Bay. Staff Sgt. Randy Wisker led the investigation into Wood's murder, and relied on a loose collection of tips prior to the arrest.

On January 8, 2008, Myers pleaded guilty to Ardeth Wood's murder as well as five unrelated assaults. He was sentenced to life in prison with no chance of parole for ten years.  Myers was denied parole in 2020.

Aftermath
Carleton University and University of Waterloo both established scholarships in Wood's name. A 109-year-old Bebb's oak tree in Ottawa's Dominion Arboretum was dedicated to Wood in 2007. The tree was split in half by a violent windstorm on September 27, 2017.

Wood's murder case was featured in a 2010 episode of Murder She Solved entitled "The Pathway Predator".

See also 
List of solved missing person cases

References

External links
Analysis of the arrest
CBC news story on arrest
Memorial page for Ardeth Wood (Archived 2009-10-25)
Ottawa Citizen story on Plea

1975 births
2000s missing person cases
2003 deaths
Canadian murder victims
Crime in Ottawa
Deaths by drowning in Canada
Deaths by person in Canada
Female murder victims
Formerly missing people
Kidnapped Canadian people
Missing person cases in Canada
Murdered students
People from Saint John, New Brunswick
People murdered in Ontario
Violence against women in Canada
Women in Ontario